Matthew Owen Gagnon (born December 10, 1980) is an American think tank executive, political strategist and writer from Maine.  He is the chief executive officer of the Maine Policy Institute, a free market think tank based in Portland, Maine. He previously was the director of digital strategy for the Republican Governors Association. Gagnon is a columnist for the Bangor Daily News, writing about Maine and national politics for the paper since August 2011, and is also currently the host of the morning show on Portland's largest talk-radio station, WGAN.

Early life and education
Gagnon grew up in Hampden, Maine, a suburb of Bangor in Penobscot County, Maine.

After graduating from Hampden Academy, he went on to pursue a degree in political science at the University of Maine. While there, he became active in campus politics, joining the student government and becoming Chairman of the University of Maine College Republicans. He later served as the President of the University of Maine General Student Senate, as well as the President of Student Government. In 2003, the school recognized him with the Student Affairs Citation for Meritorious Service to the University. In his final year, he would make an unsuccessful run to represent Old Town in the Maine House of Representatives.

Career
In 2006, Gagnon moved to the Washington, D.C. area to pursue a career in politics.  After a two-year stint as an Intelligence Analyst for an Annapolis based private security firm, he moved on to the public affairs practice of a social media marketing agency, New Media Strategies. Here, he worked with a number of political campaigns, corporations and interest groups, helping them leverage technology for use in politics.

Republican strategist
In early 2010, he was named Deputy Director of Digital Strategy for the National Republican Senatorial Committee. Here, he helped coordinate and direct the digital campaign strategy for 37 United States Senate races across the country.  At the conclusion of the election, Gagnon became the Director of New Media Communications for United States Senator Susan Collins.

The Republican Governors Association named Gagnon its Director of Digital Strategy in January 2012.  At the RGA, he was responsible for the committee's strategic digital initiatives in support of sitting Republican governors, as well as those campaigning for office.  During the 2012 Wisconsin gubernatorial recall election, Gagnon was recognized for his use of digital strategies on Walker's behalf, and for what he called the practice of using "smart data", or political data being leveraged in detailed, specific ways to persuade and turn out voters.  During his tenure at the RGA, Gagnon was recognized by Business Insider as one of the top 50 digital strategists in the country, and by Campaigns and Elections as one of the top ten communicators in politics.

Maine Policy Institute
In August 2014, Gagnon was named the new Chief Executive Officer of the Maine Heritage Policy Center, which later changed its name to the Maine Policy Institute. Founded in 2002, the Maine Policy Institute is a free-market think tank that advocates for fiscally conservative policies in Maine. It is a member of the State Policy Network.

Personal
Gagnon is married to Erin Gagnon, a teacher, with whom he has four children.  In 2013, he was involved in a serious car accident, which broke his back, requiring him to have spinal fusion surgery to repair the damage.

References

1980 births
Living people
University of Maine alumni
Maine Republicans
People from Hampden, Maine
People from Yarmouth, Maine
American male bloggers
American bloggers
American political writers
American male writers
American political consultants
21st-century American non-fiction writers
Hampden Academy alumni